Como un Campo de Maíz (Like a Cornfield) is an album released by Cuban singer-songwriter Pablo Milanés on September 25, 2005. The album earned Milanés a Latin Grammy Award for Best Singer-Songwriter Album.

Track listing
This information adapted from Allmusic.

References

2005 albums
Pablo Milanés albums
Spanish-language albums
Latin Grammy Award for Best Singer-Songwriter Album